CT Special Forces is a run and gun video game for the Game Boy Advance and PlayStation developed by  (Light and Shadow Productions) and published by . The game spawned three sequels: Back to Hell, Bioterror, and Fire for Effect.

Reception
CT Special Forces received mostly above average reviews; the game received a 71% and 72% from Metacritic and GameRankings respectively. Most critics noted its similar appearance to the Metal Slug games.

GameZone praised the game, noting that small gameplay details made the game a true "a must have". GameSpot wrote that the game was fun while it lasted, but like most shoot-em-ups, "[the game] is over too quickly." IGN noted the long release gap between the European and North American version, the latter of which was delayed for over a year, and called the game's presentation "dated".

References 

2002 video games
Game Boy Advance games
PlayStation (console) games
Run and gun games
Multiplayer and single-player video games
Video games developed in France